Dorasan station is a railway station situated on the Gyeongui Line, which used to connect North Korea and South Korea and has since been restored. Dorasan station is located approximately 650 meters (710 yards) from the southern boundary of the Korean Demilitarized Zone and is currently the northern terminus of Korail's Gyeongui-Jungang Line, which is served by Shuttle Service to Imjingang Station. North of here the former Gyeongui Line continues as the Korean State Railway's P'yŏngbu Line, but this connection is not in regular service. The current purpose of the station is largely symbolic of the hope for eventual Korean reunification.

History
On December 11, 2007, freight trains began traveling north past Dorasan station into North Korea, taking materials to the Kaesong Industrial Region, and returning with finished goods. It was scheduled to make one  trip every weekday.

On December 1, 2008, however, the North Korean government closed the border crossing after accusing South Korea of a confrontational policy. This coincided with the 2008 South Korean legislative election, and a change to a more conservative government. After that it was opened and closed again repeatedly, with the most recent reopening having been on 16 September 2013.

On December 11, 2021, a new 3.7 km Gyeongui-Jungang Line shuttle service between Imjingang Station and Dorasan Station began operations. This service operates only once during weekends and public holidays.

Train services
The station is currently served by four daily trains from Seoul, which are used mostly by tourists.

Gallery

See also
Division of Korea
DMZ Train
Dora Observatory
Dorasan
Korail
Korean State Railway
Korean Demilitarized Zone
Pyongbu Line

References

External links

Railway stations in Gyeonggi Province
North Korea–South Korea border crossings
Railway stations opened in 2002
Paju
Korean Demilitarized Zone
2002 establishments in South Korea